Kova Tilavpur  (born 13 August 1993, Asht District, Sughd Region, Tajikistan), is a Tajik musical artist, sports agent, journalist, and film actor. He is a member of the Tajik Union of Journalists.

Kova works as a football agent and has worked in the transfers of players Omid Ebrahimi, Nuriddin Davronov, Ahtam Nazarov, Jahongir Ergashev, Shahrom Samiev,  Ehson Panjshanbe, Fathullo Fathulloev and others.

Early life 
Kova Tilavpur was born on August 16, 1993, in Asht District in the family of Tajik journalist Tilav Rasulzoda. Graduated from secondary school No. 8 in Khujand, Khujand State University, Tajik State Institute of Languages, Imam Khomeini International University and Allameh Tabataba'i University.

Filmography 
In 2001, he played the role of Yatim in the film Angel on the Right directed by Jamshed Usmonov.

Music 
Since 2011 Tilavpur has been engaged in professional music, in the genre of rap and hip hop. In 2016 he released the album "Hands of Hands".

 Даст ба даст “Hands of hands” 
 Vaqte yodam meoi
 Mother
 Bas Nakard
 Giriftori tu hastam
 Nolai be sado
 Modare man & Baraka 2015, together with the Baraka group, performs the duet song "Modareman"

References

External links
 

Tajikistani actors
Tajikistani journalists
Association football agents
1993 births
Living people